Lidia Popova was a Russian figure skater who competed in both ladies' singles and pair skating.

With partner Alexander Fischer, they were the first Russian skaters to win a medal in pairs skating at World Championships. It happened at the very first World Pairs Figure Skating Championship in 1908 where they were third.

Competitive highlights

Ladies

Pairs 
'''With Alexander Fischer

References

External links 
 Lidia Popova at Fskate.ru

Russian female single skaters
Russian female pair skaters
Figure skaters from Saint Petersburg
Year of birth missing
Year of death missing